A total solar eclipse occurred on February 5, 1962. A solar eclipse occurs when the Moon passes between Earth and the Sun, thereby totally or partly obscuring the image of the Sun for a viewer on Earth. A total solar eclipse occurs when the Moon's apparent diameter is larger than the Sun's, blocking all direct sunlight, turning day into darkness. Totality occurs in a narrow path across Earth's surface, with the partial solar eclipse visible over a surrounding region thousands of kilometres wide. Totality was visible from Indonesia, Netherlands New Guinea (now belonging to Indonesia), the Territory of Papua New Guinea (today's Papua New Guinea), British Solomon Islands (today's Solomon Islands), and Palmyra Atoll.

Observation 
A team sent by Kyoto University of Japan observed this eclipse in Lae, the second largest city and a port on the east coast of the Territory Papua New Guinea. The spectrum was analyzed with spectrophotometry, and photometry of the inner corona was conducted.

Related eclipses

Solar eclipses of 1961–1964

Saros 130

Metonic series

Notes

References

 The Flash Spectrum Observed at the Total Eclipse of February 5, 1962, Publications of the Astronomical Society of Japan, vol. 21, p.141 (1969).

1962 02 05
1962 02 05
1962 in science
February 1962 events